Helleveeg  is a 1920 Dutch silent film directed by Theo Frenkel.

Cast
 Mien Duymaer Van Twist - Jane, de Helleveeg
 Co Balfoort - Willem Hendriks
 Lily Bouwmeester - Louise
 Frits Fuchs - Willems broer (as Frits Fuchs jr.)
 Herman Schwab - Meneer van Wijck
 Theo Mann-Bouwmeester - Mevrouw Van Wijck
 Joop van Hulzen - Louise's verloofde
 Johan Kaart - Butler van Wijck (as Johan Kaart sr.)
 Mien Braakensiek - Butlers vrouw
 Wilhelmina Schwab-Welman
 Annie Frenkel-Wesling
 Wilhelmina Kleij
 Dio Huysmans
 Nola Hatterman
 Christiaan Laurentius

External links 
 

1920 films
Dutch silent feature films
Dutch black-and-white films
Films directed by Theo Frenkel